Sofiane Fekih (born 9 August 1969) is a Tunisian former footballer who played as a midfielder. He played in 43 matches for the Tunisia national team from 1994 to 1998. He was also named in Tunisia's squad for the 1998 African Cup of Nations tournament.

References

External links
 

1969 births
Living people
Tunisian footballers
Association football midfielders
Tunisia international footballers
1996 African Cup of Nations players
1998 African Cup of Nations players
Tunisian Ligue Professionnelle 1 players
CS Sfaxien players
Place of birth missing (living people)